Beparis are a group of traders or intermediaries in the raw jute trade, that stock and supply raw jute to jute mills in West Bengal, India and Bangladesh.  The jute mills generally don't buy raw jute from the farmers.  For the supply of raw jute, the jute mills rely on the Beparis who directly buy raw jute from the farmers.

References

Economic history of Bangladesh
Economy of West Bengal
Jute industry
Jute industry of India